Kristoffer Haugen (born 21 February 1994) is a Norwegian professional footballer who plays as a left-back for Eliteserien club Molde.

Early life
Haugen hails from Verdalen. He started his career in Voll IL, but joined the youth ranks of Viking in 2007. It was a successful youth team, which won the national boys-16 football cup in 2009.

Club career

Viking
Haugen made his senior team debut in the 2012 La Manga Cup against FK Ekranas in February 2012, scoring his first first-team goal in the first round of the 2013 Norwegian Football Cup. He made his league debut when he started, and played 90 minutes, in the two last fixtures of the 2013 Tippeligaen.

Molde
On 10 January 2018, Haugen signed a three-year contract with Molde FK. He made his debut for the club in the 5–0 home win against Sandefjord on 11 March 2018.

On 15 June 2020, Haugen signed a new contract with Molde, until the end of the 2022 season.

International career
Haugen played a total of 25 games for Norway at international youth level.

Career statistics

Club

Honours
Molde
Eliteserien: 2019, 2022
Norwegian Cup: 2021–22

References

1994 births
Living people
People from Klepp
Norwegian footballers
Viking FK players
Molde FK players
Eliteserien players
Association football defenders
Norway youth international footballers
Norway under-21 international footballers
Sportspeople from Rogaland